Lucas Bacmeister may refer to:
 Lucas Bacmeister (cricketer) (1869–1962), English cricketer
 Lucas Bacmeister (theologian) (1530–1608), Lutheran theologian and composer